Rianne Frida Loes Van Rompaey (born 3 January 1996) is a Dutch fashion model. Vogue has called her a top model. She is one of 50 models who appeared on the cover of the 50th anniversary September issue of Vogue Italia, photographed by Steven Meisel. She also appeared solo on a Vogue Italia cover in March 2016. Her beauty has been described as pre-Raphaelite. She has appeared on the cover of Vogue Paris over 6 times under editor Emmanuelle Alt.

Early life 
Van Rompaey was born in Hoofddorp, North Holland, and raised in Wageningen, The Netherlands, to Dutch and Belgian parents. She attended Montessori School there and obtained VWO-diploma at Pantarijn College. She began modeling professionally as a high school student. Van Rompaey started her career by sending photographs to Paparazzi Models.

Career 
Van Rompaey's first photoshoot was for the January 2013 and February 2013 issues of Elle Netherlands.

In 2014, Nicolas Ghesquiere chose Van Rompaey to be a Louis Vuitton exclusive, which included campaigns for the brand including S/S 2016 with actor Jaden Smith. She has done campaigns for Chanel, Alexander McQueen, Valentino, Miu Miu, Chloe, Moschino, Celine, Ports 1961, Michael Kors, Fendi, Alberta Ferretti, Loewe, Sacai, Salvatore Ferragamo, Versace, Marc Jacobs, Isabel Marant, Prada, Coach, Bottega Veneta, Hugo Boss, and Burberry.

Van Rompaey has appeared on covers of Vogue Italia, Vogue Paris, Vogue China, Vogue Germany, Vogue Japan, Vogue Korea, Vogue Russia, Vogue Netherlands and T: The New York Times Style Magazine, and Harper's Bazaar.

In 2016, casting director Piergiorgio Del Moro, who placed Van Rompaey in Versace, Victoria Beckham, and Fendi shows, told Vogue magazine that van Rompaey would have a long career because of her personality. Vogue Paris editor-in-chief Emmanuelle Alt corroborated this view.

In September 2019, for the 1000th issue of Vogue Paris, she simultaneously appeared on 4 covers; the same year she had appeared on March and May covers of the magazine. She also appeared on 3 covers for WSJ Magazine that month. In December 2019, she was chosen as runner-up for models.com's "Model of the Year" awards.

Van Rompaey was ranked on Models.com's "Top 50" models list in 2016, calling her "one of the year's biggest breakout stars". In the same year, ELLE UK and Harper's Bazaar UK predicted van Rompaey was on track to becoming a supermodel. She is currently ranked as an "Industry Icon" by models.com.

References

1996 births
Living people
Dutch female models
LGBT models
People from Wageningen
Dutch people of Belgian descent
Louis Vuitton exclusive models